Events from the year 1976 in Jordan.

Incumbents
Monarch: Hussein 
Prime Minister: Zaid al-Rifai (until 13 July), Mudar Badran (starting 13 July)

Births
Saba Mubarak

Deaths
Suleiman Nabulsi

See also

 Years in Iraq
 Years in Syria
 Years in Saudi Arabia

References

 
1970s in Jordan
Jordan
Jordan
Years of the 20th century in Jordan